European route E18 runs from Craigavon in Northern Ireland to Saint Petersburg in Russia, passing through Scotland, England, Norway, Sweden and Finland.

Although the designation implies the possibility of a through journey, this is no longer practical as there are no direct car ferry crossings between the United Kingdom and Norway.

United Kingdom 
The route starts in Northern Ireland and runs from Craigavon (M1) – Belfast (M2, A8) – Larne, then to Scotland: Stranraer, Dumfries and Galloway (A75) – Gretna – then England via the (M6) – Carlisle (A69) to Newcastle. As is normal for European routes in the United Kingdom, it is not signposted as such.

Northern Ireland 
: Belfast
: Belfast -   (Multiplex with )
:  - 
:  - Larne (End of multiplex with )

North Channel 
: Larne - Cairnryan

Great Britain 
: Stranraer - 
:  - Anglo-Scottish border (Start of multiplex with )
: Anglo-Scottish border - Carlisle (End of multiplex with )

North Sea 
There are no ferries from Newcastle to Norway. Freight-only ferries may operate from other United Kingdom ports to Norway or Denmark, but for car journeys the only practical route is a crossing to France, Belgium or the Netherlands, followed by a road journey through Germany and Denmark, and a ferry crossing from there to Norway.

Norway 
The route continues as a motorway from Kristiansand in Norway. E18 is connected with the E39 Ferry to Denmark. The ferry runs from Kristansand to Hirtshals, takes about 3 hours and 15 minutes, and is operated by Color Line.

It runs Kristiansand – Arendal – Porsgrunn – Larvik – Sandefjord – Tønsberg – Horten – Drammen – Oslo – Ås – Askim – Ørje (at the Swedish border).

A flyover carrying the E18 Holmestrand bypass, opened in 2001, partially collapsed in February 2015 following a landslip, necessitating its demolition.

Sweden 
From Ørje, the E18 crosses the border into Sweden at Töcksfors. It runs Töcksfors – Karlstad – Örebro – Västerås – Stockholm / Kapellskär.

Baltic Sea 
The connection over the Baltic Sea is from Stockholm or Kapellskär in Sweden via Åland to Turku or Naantali in Finland, by ferries operated by Silja Line, Viking Line or Finnlines. It is also possible to take a direct ferry from Stockholm to Helsinki or to continue from Åland by island hopping over bridges, by cable ferries and ferries in Åland and Åboland, partly along the Archipelago Ring Road, but these routes are not part of the E18.

Finland 

In Finland the E18 goes from Åland through southern Finland by way of Turku/Naantali – Salo – Lohja – Espoo – Vantaa – Porvoo – Loviisa – Kotka – Hamina – Vaalimaa till the border with Russia. Crossing the border to Russia used to often require queuing as the volume of traffic using it increased. The situation has since 2009 improved thanks to increased capacity, and a new parking lot constructed by 2016 is expected to solve the problem for good.

Russia 

In Russia, E18 goes along the M10 highway from the Finnish border to Saint Petersburg. The stretch of M10 between Saint Petersburg and the Finnish border has been redesignated to A181 in 2018. The route runs through northwestern Leningrad Oblast and mostly through sparsely populated areas. Since 2003, after opening of the Vyborg bypass, E18 does not go through Vyborg, though previously it did. Near Saint Petersburg, the route runs through suburbs, such as Sestroretsk and Olgino. E18 terminates at the western border of Saint Petersburg.

There are plans to expand the road from one to three lanes in each direction because of the increasing volume of traffic. In 2012, the highway has been connected with the Western Rapid Diameter near Beloostrov by expanded existing junction of M10 with the Zelenogorsk highway. It is likely to be a new terminus of E18.

Gallery

References

External links 

 UN Economic Commission for Europe: Overall Map of E-road Network (2007)
Queue situation at the Finnish/Russian border.

18
18
1-0018E
E018
1-0018E
1-0018E
E018E
1-0018E
E018
1-0018E
1-0018E
1-0018E
1-0018E
1-0018E
E018
E018
E018
E018
E018
E018
 
E18